Peck Mountain of south-central Connecticut, is a traprock mountain ridge located in Cheshire, Connecticut. It is part of the narrow, linear Metacomet Ridge that extends from Long Island Sound near New Haven, north through the Connecticut River Valley of Massachusetts to the Vermont border. The Metacomet Ridge continues south from Peck Mountain as Mount Sanford and north as a diminishing series of hills that extend into Southington, Connecticut.

See also
 Metacomet Ridge
 Adjacent summits:

References
 Farnsworth, Elizabeth J. (2004). "Metacomet-Mattabesett Trail Natural Resource Assessment." Retrieved November 1, 2007. 
 Cheshire Land Trust
 Traprock Wilderness Recovery Strategy
 Topozone.com

Cheshire, Connecticut
Mountains of Connecticut
Metacomet Ridge, Connecticut
Landforms of New Haven County, Connecticut